Peter Murray McQuade (born 4 November 1948) was a Scottish footballer who played for Dumbarton, East Fife and Berwick Rangers.

References

1948 births
Scottish footballers
Dumbarton F.C. players
East Fife F.C. players
Berwick Rangers F.C. players
Scottish Football League players
Living people
Association football fullbacks